Francisco Cuervo y Valdés (16 June 1651 – 1714) was a Spanish politician who governed Nuevo León (1687-1688), Nueva Extremadura (1698–1703), New Philippines (1698–1702), and Santa Fe de Nuevo México (1704–1707).

Early years
Cuervo y Valdés was born on June 16, 1651, in Santa María de Grado (in Asturias, Spain). His family was of noble background.  Cuervo y Valdes was a Knight of Santiago and a Treasury official in Guadalajara. In 1678, he emigrated to New Spain, in what is now Mexico.

Career
Upon arrival to New Spain, he served as an infantry captain and later he was appointed lieutenant governor of Sonora. In 1698, Cuervo y Valdés served as lieutenant governor of Nuevo Leon and Coahuila (in what is now modern Mexico). From 1698 to 1702, he served as the third governor of Spanish Texas.

Under his administration, a series of missions were founded: San Antonio Galindo Moctezuma (founded by  Cuervo y Valdés and Friar Francisco Portoles on October 26, 1698), San Felipe Valladares (November, 1698), the mission of Valle de San Bartolome de Jesus later renamed "Santísimo Nombre de Jesus de los Peyotes" (founded by Sergeant Mayor Diego Ramón on December 18, 1698), the mission of San Juan Bautista and the Valle of Santo Domingo (1699), the  Mission of San Francisco de Solano (by Antonio de Olivares in 1700), Nuestra Señora de Guadalupe and Santo Cristo (1701), and the mission of San Bernardo (1703).

In 1704, Cuervo y Valdés was appointed acting governor of New Mexico by the Viceroy of New Spain, Francisco Fernández de la Cueva Enríquez, Duke of Alburquerque. Thus, Cuervo y Valdés had to leave the government of Coahuila, taking office on March 10, 1705.

Upon arrival in the province, Cuervo y Valdés found that social and political conditions were quite poor. This being a result of the continuing war between the Apaches and the Navajos against the Spanish settlers and Pueblos, who were allied with the Spanish. Cuervo y Valdés led troops against the Apaches, but the number of soldiers was too small to effectively defend the territory. This led him to send a letter to the Viceroy of New Spain requesting reinforcements but the viceroy did not attend the request. Shortly after, he asked the Puebloans for assistance, who agreed to join his troops. With the soldiers in need of supplies, Cuervo y Valdés again requested assistance from the viceroy in securing weapons, ammunition, and clothing. However, only a small amount of weapons and ammunition was sent to New Mexico.

On April 23, 1706, Cuervo y Valdés founded La Villa Real de San Francisco de Alburquerque (now Albuquerque), naming the town in honour of the Viceroy of New Spain, Francisco Fernández de la Cueva Enríquez, Duke of Alburquerque. Cuervo y Valdés ordered that a Spanish garrison be stationed in the town. At the time, Albuquerque was inhabited by thirty to thorty-five families who had settled along the banks of the Rio Grande.  

Cuervo y Valdés refounded several other towns in New Mexico, including Santa Maria de Galisteo (formerly known as Santa Cruz), which was populated by about eighteen families from Tanos. He left office in 1707.

Cuervo y Valdés eventually returned to Mexico City and died in 1714.

Personal life 
Valdés married María Francisca and they had two children: Francisco Antonio Cuervo and Ana María Cuervo.

References

External links

 New Mexico State Record Center and Archives

Governors of Coahuila
Governors of Spanish Texas
Colonial governors of Santa Fe de Nuevo México
1615 births
1714 deaths
People from Asturias
1690s in Mexico
1700s in Mexico
1690s in Texas
1700s in Texas